Alf Horn (6 January 1913 – 5 April 1991) was a Canadian épée, foil and sabre fencer. He competed in five events at the 1948 Summer Olympics.

References

External links
 

1913 births
1991 deaths
Canadian male foil fencers
Olympic fencers of Canada
Fencers at the 1948 Summer Olympics
Sportspeople from Møre og Romsdal
Canadian male épée fencers
Canadian male sabre fencers